.avi is the second studio album of the Serbian experimental band Consecration. The album received a string of positive reviews from all over the Balkans region and Europe, which increased the band's popularity further.

Track listing 
All songs written and performed by Consecration

 "Aligator" – 8:30
 ".avi" – 13:56
 "Cisterna" – 1:07
 "Somna" – 7:29
 "Idiot Glee" – 11:25
 "Đavo Nije Urban" – 14:17

Reception 

Apart from the very positive reviews by other European reviewers, the album was critically very positively acclaimed by reviewers from Serbia, Croatia and other countries in the former Yugoslavia region. Nenad Milosavljević from Popboks gave 7/10 stars for this album with the comment that .avi "presents a release whose echo could very easily go overseas, over boundaries of the autistic miniature scene they belong to". Slobodan Trifunović from Metal Sound gave the album ten out of ten stars, saying that the album "is one beautiful piece of music, well rounded work of experienced musicians and it will for sure go down in history as one of the best releases of harder music in Serbia". Croatian Cmar-net awarded the album with the rating of 9/10, praising the album as one of the most refreshing releases in past couple of years. Later on, Popboks announced that Consecration's .avi is the Serbian Album of The Year 2010, as voted by the jury.

Personnel 
Consecration:
 Matija Dagović – Drums and Percussion
 David Lazar Galić – Bass
 Danilo Nikodinovski – Vocals and Guitar
 Nikola Milojević – Guitar
 Nemanja Trećaković – Keyboards, Samples
Other:
 Marko Jovanović – Recording/Production
 Aleksandar Zec – Photography
 Stojan Reljić – Guitar on "Cisterna"
 Milutin Jovančić – Backing vocals on "Somna"
 Jelena Stanićević – Backing vocals on "Idiot Glee"

References

External links 
 http://consecration.bandcamp.com/album/avi
 http://www.metal-sound.net/interviews.php?read=consecration
 .avi review on Prog Sphere

Consecration (band) albums
2010 albums